Thomas & Friends: The Great Race is a 2016 British computer-animated musical comedy adventure film and feature-length special of the British television series, Thomas & Friends. The film was produced by HIT Entertainment and animated by Arc Productions.

The film stars the voices of Joseph May and John Hasler as the voice of Thomas in the US and the UK, respectively. It also stars the voices of Rasmus Hardiker, Kerry Shale, Christopher Ragland, Nigel Pilkington, Rob Rackstraw, Teresa Gallagher and Keith Wickham, with Mark Moraghan narrating.

Tina Desai, Rufus Jones and John Schwab join the cast, with Jones taking on the role of the iconic real-life locomotive Flying Scotsman, who appeared only in the Railway Series book Enterprising Engines and was reduced to a brief cameo role when the book was adapted for television. In an effort to expand the preschool franchise, the new engines are from locations around the world and include several female characters. The film borrows concepts from the 1991 book Thomas and the Great Railway Show, but is not a direct adaptation of said book.

This was the last production to be animated by Arc Productions under their original name before they were bought by Jam Filled Toronto in August 2016, as well as the last feature length production from HiT Entertainment before being renamed to Mattel Creations, (later Mattel Television) in March 2016.

Plot
While at Vicarstown Station, Thomas the Tank Engine is introduced to Gordon's brother, The Flying Scotsman, who is taking part in The Great Railway Show on the Mainland and encourages Thomas to try and take part as well. Although every engine on Sodor wants to take part, Sir Topham Hatt has not made up his mind yet, and Thomas fears he won't be picked to go to the competition.

At Brendam Docks, Thomas has a run-in with several of the competitors for The Great Railway Show when their rail ferry docks there by mistake, and as a result, one of them is left behind. Ashima, a beautifully-painted tank engine from India accidentally bumps Thomas in her hurry to try and make the ferry, nearly pushing him over the edge into the water. He quickly retreats from the docks.

Ashima is lost and the other engines are too busy to help her find her way. Meanwhile, at the Dieselworks, Diesel devises a trick that involves disguising Den, Dart, and Paxton as trucks, so as to trick Sir Topham Hatt into entering him into the competition instead of Henry. Ashima suggests to Thomas that he partake in the Shunting competition.

At Knapford Junction, Diesel's trick goes awry when Thomas tries to practice shunting with them. His buffer beam gets damaged in the crash, and his repairs mean he will not be able to go to the competition. Sir Topham Hatt reveals he was planning to enter Thomas into the shunting challenge the whole time, but because of his repairs, Percy will take his place. However, Thomas rushes to the mainland to deliver Gordon’s safety valve when the valve has not been properly installed while Gordon was being streamlined, despite not being fully repaired. 

At The Great Railway Show, due to not waiting to have his safety valve installed, Gordon's boiler explodes and he loses the race after refusing to listen to Thomas about installing his safety valve. With Percy's insistence, Thomas takes his place in the shunting competition, but sacrifices his win to Ashima in order to save her from crashing into a derailed flatbed. However, the judges decide to award Thomas the win alongside Ashima for good sportsmanship. Sir Topham Hatt and the other Sodor engines are very proud of Thomas.

With The Great Railway Show over, everyone is helping Thomas to try and find Ashima so that he can say goodbye when Sir Topham signals for his engines to return to Sodor. Extremely forlorn, Thomas thinks he has missed his chance until he hears her singing as she fills up with coal. Elated, he invites Ashima to come back to Sodor with him, allowing them to spend some more time together before catching her rail ferry back to India from there.

During the credits, the Diesels look for Diesel at Brendam Docks. Diesel, stuck in a crate, calls for help as he sails away on a ship leaving Sodor.

Songs
 "Will You Won't You" – Full company

 "Streamlining" – Thomas, Annie and Clarabel

 "I'm Full of Surprises" – Diesel

 "You Can Only Be You" – Thomas and Ashima

 "The Shooting Star is Coming Through" – Gordon

 "Be Who You Are, and Go Far" – Thomas, Ashima, Philip, Emily, Gordon, Henry, James, Percy 

 "He's Full of Surprises" – Ian McCue, Oliver Davis, Andrew Brenner and David Stoten

Voice cast

Reception

Box office 
The film was originally theatrically released on 21 May 2016, in the United Kingdom. The film ranked tenth in its opening weekend, grossing $214,133 from 292 theaters with an average of $733 per theater. The film decreased 77.1% and fell to 19th in its sophomore weekend, grossing $48,944 from 205 theaters with an average of $238 per theater. The film ranked in 18th, 26th, and 27th place in its third, fourth, and fifth weekends.

The film was re-released in China on 22 September 2017 and in South Korea on 30 November 2017. The film had a strong debut in China, ranking fifth in its first weekend and grossing $1.6 million. In its sophomore weekend, the film dropped 86.5% to 13th place, grossing $227,528. The film was less successful in South Korea, ranking 12th in its first weekend with $68,820 from 249 theaters, with an average of $276 per theater.

Critical response 
Renee Schonfeld of Common Sense Media awarded the film 3 out of 5 stars, writing, "Entertaining train tale with mild peril, positive messages".

References

External links
 
 Trailer
 Excerpt

2016 films
Thomas & Friends
Films set in Cumbria
Universal Pictures direct-to-video animated films
2010s American animated films
Universal Pictures direct-to-video films
Mattel Creations films
2016 computer-animated films
British computer-animated films
American computer-animated films
2010s children's animated films
Animated films about trains
Universal Pictures animated films
2010s English-language films
2010s British films